Schoonschip was one of the first computer algebra systems, developed in 1963 by Martinus J. G. Veltman, for use in particle physics.

"Schoonschip" refers to the Dutch expression "schoon schip maken": to make a clean sweep, to clean/clear things up (literally: to make the ship clean). The name was chosen "among others to annoy everybody, who could not speak Dutch". 

Veltman initially developed the program to compute the quadrupole moment of the W boson, the computation of which involved "a monstrous expression involving in the order of 50,000 terms in intermediate stages"   

The initial version, dating to December 1963, ran on an IBM 7094 mainframe.  In 1966 it was ported to the CDC 6600 mainframe, and later to most of the rest of Control Data's CDC line.  In 1983 it was ported to the Motorola 68000 microprocessor, allowing its use on a number of 68000-based systems running variants of Unix.

FORM can be regarded, in a sense, as the successor to Schoonschip.

See also 
 Comparison of computer algebra systems

References

External links
Documentation
Schoonschip program files, documentation, and examples

Further reading
 Close, Frank (2011) The Infinity Puzzle. Oxford University Press. Describes the historical context of and rationale for 'Schoonschip' (Chapter 11: "And Now I Introduce Mr 't Hooft")

Computer algebra systems
Computer science in the Netherlands 
Information technology in the Netherlands